Juan Bautista 'Tata' Yofre is an Argentine journalist and writer, and a former politician and journalist.

Yofre was the Argentine Secretary of Intelligence from 1989 to 1990, in the early part of Carlos Menem's presidency. He was replaced by Hugo Anzorreguy following constant accusations of corruption surrounding the Presidential environment. He later occupied positions as ambassador to Panama and other countries.

References

See also
List of Argentine Secretaries of Intelligence

Year of birth missing (living people)
Living people
Argentine journalists
Male journalists
Argentine Secretaries of Intelligence
Argentine diplomats
Ambassadors of Argentina to Panama
Place of birth missing (living people)